Filiberto Azcuy Aguilera (born October 13, 1972) is a Cuban wrestler (Greco-Roman style) who has won two Olympic gold medals.

References

External links
 

1972 births
Living people
Olympic wrestlers of Cuba
Olympic gold medalists for Cuba
Wrestlers at the 1996 Summer Olympics
Wrestlers at the 2000 Summer Olympics
Wrestlers at the 2004 Summer Olympics
Cuban male sport wrestlers
Olympic medalists in wrestling
Medalists at the 2000 Summer Olympics
Medalists at the 1996 Summer Olympics
Pan American Games gold medalists for Cuba
Pan American Games medalists in wrestling
Wrestlers at the 1995 Pan American Games
Medalists at the 1995 Pan American Games
20th-century Cuban people
21st-century Cuban people